Baylys Beach is a beach and settlement on the west coast of Northland, New Zealand. The beach is on the northern side of the settlement, with Ripiro Beach on the southern side.

History
The Battle of Moremonui was fought about 6 km northwest of Baylys Beach between Ngāti Whātua and Ngāpuhi iwi in 1807 or 1808.

The coast saw many shipwrecks during the 19th century. Aurora was wrecked in 1840 when leaving Kaipara Harbour and the French corvette L'Alcméne was wrecked in 1851 with the loss of 12 lives.

The beach may have been named after an early settler named Bayly who owned 20 km of the shoreline. The name has been in use since at least 1918.

Demographics
Baylys Beach is part of the larger Kaipara Coastal statistical area.

Baylys Beach had a population of 309 at the 2018 New Zealand census, unchanged since the 2013 census, and an increase of 30 people (10.8%) since the 2006 census. There were 141 households, comprising 156 males and 153 females, giving a sex ratio of 1.02 males per female, with 42 people (13.6%) aged under 15 years, 36 (11.7%) aged 15 to 29, 162 (52.4%) aged 30 to 64, and 72 (23.3%) aged 65 or older.

Ethnicities were 88.3% European/Pākehā, 19.4% Māori, 5.8% Pacific peoples, 2.9% Asian, and 2.9% other ethnicities. People may identify with more than one ethnicity.

Although some people chose not to answer the census's question about religious affiliation, 55.3% had no religion, 35.0% were Christian and 1.0% had other religions.

Of those at least 15 years old, 39 (14.6%) people had a bachelor's or higher degree, and 57 (21.3%) people had no formal qualifications. 39 people (14.6%) earned over $70,000 compared to 17.2% nationally. The employment status of those at least 15 was that 120 (44.9%) people were employed full-time, 36 (13.5%) were part-time, and 9 (3.4%) were unemployed.

Notes

External links
Community website

Kaipara District
Populated places in the Northland Region